Fontanilla is a former public fountain of Palos de la Frontera in Spain.

People

Sports
 Kiara Fontanilla, Filipino-American footballer

Fictional characters
 Atty. Gabriel Fontanilla, a character from You're My Home
 Marian Angeles-Fontanilla, a character from You're My Home
 Grace A. Fontanilla-Vergara, a character from You're My Home
 Rahm A. Fontanilla, a character from You're My Home
 Clarisse Velez-Fontanilla, a character from You're My Home